Greta Tintin Eleonora Ernman Thunberg  (born 3 January 2003) is a Swedish environmental activist who is known for challenging world leaders to take immediate action for climate change mitigation.

Thunberg's activism began when she persuaded her parents to adopt lifestyle choices that reduced their own carbon footprint. In August 2018, at age 15, she started spending her Fridays outside the Swedish Parliament to call for stronger action on climate change by holding up a sign reading  (School Strike for Climate). Thunberg initially gained notice for her youth and her straightforward and blunt speaking manner, both in public and to political leaders and assemblies, in which she criticizes world leaders for their failure to take what she considers sufficient action to address the climate crisis.

Soon, other students engaged in similar protests in their own communities. Together, they organized a school climate strike movement under the name Fridays for Future. After Thunberg addressed the 2018 United Nations Climate Change Conference, student strikes took place every week all around the world. In 2019, there were multiple coordinated multi-city protests involving over a million students each. To avoid carbon-intensive flying, Thunberg sailed on a yacht to North America, where she attended the 2019 UN Climate Action Summit. Her speech there, in which she exclaimed "How dare you?", was widely taken up by the press and incorporated into music. She speaks fluent English, and most of her public interactions are in English.

Her sudden rise to world fame made her both a leader in the activist community and a target for critics, especially due to her youth. Her influence on the world stage has been described by The Guardian and other newspapers as the "Greta effect". She received numerous honours and awards, including an honorary Fellowship of the Royal Scottish Geographical Society, inclusion in Time 100 most influential people, being the youngest Time Person of the Year, inclusion in the Forbes list of The World's 100 Most Powerful Women (2019), and nominations for the Nobel Peace Prize in 2019, 2020, 2021 and 2022.

Early life 
Greta Tintin Eleonora Ernman Thunberg was born on 3 January 2003, in Stockholm, Sweden, the daughter of opera singer Malena Ernman and actor Svante Thunberg. Her paternal grandfather was actor and director Olof Thunberg. (As explained by The Week, "with a thespian father" and singer mother, "it is perhaps unsurprising that [she] has a slightly unusual name.... Thunberg shares her second name with the adventuring creation of Belgian cartoonist Georges Remi, better known as Hergé.") She has a younger sister, Beata.

Thunberg says she first heard about climate change in 2011, when she was eight years old, and could not understand why so little was being done about it. The situation made her depressed and as a result, at the age of 11, she stopped talking and eating much and lost  in two months. Eventually, she was diagnosed with Asperger syndrome, obsessive–compulsive disorder (OCD), and selective mutism. In one of her first speeches demanding climate action, Thunberg described the selective mutism aspect of her condition as meaning she "only speaks when necessary".

Thunberg struggled with depression for almost four years before she began her school strike campaign. When she started protesting, her parents did not support her activism. Her father said he does not like her missing school but said: "[We] respect that she wants to make a stand. She can either sit at home and be really unhappy, or protest, and be happy." Her diagnosis of Asperger's syndrome was made public nationwide in Sweden by her mother in May 2015, in order to help other families in a similar situation. While acknowledging that her diagnosis "has limited [her] before", Thunberg does not view her Asperger's as an illness, and has instead called it her "superpower". She was later described as being not only the best-known climate change activist, but also the best-known autism activist. Thunberg commented in 2021 that many people in the Fridays for Future movement had autism, and were very inclusive and welcoming. She thinks that the reason for so many people with autism becoming climate activists is that they cannot look away, and have to tell the truth as they see it: "I know lots of people who have been depressed, and then they have joined the climate movement or Fridays for Future and have found a purpose in life and found friendship and a community that they are welcome in." She considers the best things that have resulted from her activism are friendships and happiness.

For about two years, Thunberg challenged her parents to lower the family's carbon footprint and overall impact on the environment by becoming vegan, upcycling, and giving up flying. She has said she tried showing them graphs and data, but when that did not work, she warned her family that they were stealing her future. Giving up flying in part meant her mother had to give up her international career as an opera singer. When interviewed in December 2019 by the BBC, her father said: "To be honest, (her mother) didn't do it to save the climate. She did it to save her child because she saw how much it meant to her, and then, when she did that, she saw how much (Greta) grew from that, how much energy she got from it." Thunberg credits her parents' eventual response and lifestyle changes with giving her hope and belief that she could make a difference. When asked in September 2021 whether she felt guilty about ending her mother's career, she was surprised by the question: "It was her choice. I didn't make her do anything. I just provided her with the information to base her decision on." The family story is recounted in the 2018 book Scenes from the Heart, updated in 2020 as Our House Is on Fire: Scenes of a Family and a Planet in Crisis, with contributions from the girls, and the whole family credited as authors.

Activism

Strike at the Riksdag 

In August 2018, Thunberg began the school climate strikes and public speeches for which she has become an internationally recognized climate activist. In an interview with Amy Goodman from Democracy Now!, she said she got the idea of a climate strike after school shootings in the United States in February 2018 led to several youths refusing to go back to school. These teen activists at Marjory Stoneman Douglas High School in Parkland, Florida, went on to organize the March for Our Lives in support of greater gun control. In May 2018, Thunberg won a climate change essay competition held by Swedish newspaper Svenska Dagbladet. In part, she wrote "I want to feel safe. How can I feel safe when I know we are in the greatest crisis in human history?"

After the paper published her article, Thunberg was contacted by Bo Thorén from Fossil Free Dalsland, a group interested in doing something about climate change. Thunberg attended a few of their meetings. At one of them, Thorén suggested that school children could strike for climate change. Thunberg tried to persuade other young people to get involved but "no one was really interested", so eventually she decided to go ahead with the strike by herself.

On 20 August 2018, Thunberg, who had just started ninth grade, decided not to attend school until the 2018 Swedish general election on 9 September; her protest began after the heat waves and wildfires during Sweden's hottest summer in at least 262 years. Her demands were that the Swedish government reduce carbon emissions in accordance with the Paris Agreement, and she protested by sitting outside the Riksdag every day for three weeks during school hours with the sign Skolstrejk för klimatet (School strike for climate).

Thunberg said her teachers were divided in their views about her missing class to make her point. She says: "As people, they think what I am doing is good, but as teachers, they say I should stop."

Social media activism 
After Thunberg posted a photo of her first strike day on Instagram and Twitter, other social media accounts quickly took up her cause. High-profile youth activists amplified her Instagram post, and on the second day she was joined by other activists. A representative of the Finnish bank Nordea quoted one of Thunberg's tweets to more than 200,000 followers. Thunberg's social media profile attracted local reporters whose stories earned international coverage in little more than a week.

One Swedish climate-focused social media company was We Don't Have Time (WDHT), founded by Ingmar Rentzhog. He said her strike only began attracting public attention after he turned up with a freelance photographer and posted Thunberg's photograph on his Facebook page and Instagram account, and a video in English that he posted on the company's YouTube channel. Rentzhog subsequently asked Thunberg to become an unpaid youth advisor to WDHT. He then used her name and image without her knowledge or permission to raise millions for a WDHT for-profit subsidiary, We Don't Have Time AB, of which Rentzhog is the chief executive officer. Thunberg received no money from the company and terminated her volunteer advisor role with WDHT once she realized they were making money from her name.

After October 2018, Thunberg's activism evolved from solitary protesting to taking part in demonstrations throughout Europe, making several high-profile public speeches and mobilizing her growing number of followers on social media platforms. After the December 2018 general elections, Thunberg continued to strike only on Fridays. She inspired school students across the globe to take part in student strikes. That month, more than 20,000 students had held strikes in at least 270 cities.

Thunberg spoke out against the National Eligibility cum Entrance Test (Undergraduate) 2020 and Joint Entrance Examination 2020 entrance exams, which are being conducted in India in September. She said that it is unfair for students to appear for exams in the middle of a global pandemic. She also said that the students of India have been deeply impacted by the floods that hit states such as Bihar and Assam, which cause mass destruction for the citizens.

On 3 February 2021, Thunberg tweeted in support of the ongoing 2020–2021 Indian farmers' protest. Effigies of Thunberg were burned in Delhi by nationalists who were against the farmer protests. Greta Thunberg's tweet received criticism from the BJP-led Indian government, which said that it was an internal matter. In her initial tweet, Thunberg linked to a document which provided a campaigning toolkit for those who wanted to support the farmers' protest. This toolkit contained advice on hashtags and how to sign petitions but also included suggested actions beyond those directly linked to the farmer's protest. She soon deleted the tweet, saying the document was "outdated" and linked to an alternative one "to enable anyone unfamiliar with the ongoing farmers protests in India to better understand the situation and make decisions on how to support the farmers based on their own analysis." The 22-year-old Indian climate activist who edited the toolkit, Disha Ravi, was arrested under the charges of sedition and criminal conspiracy on 16 February.

Protests and speeches in Europe 

Her speech during the plenary session of the 2018 United Nations Climate Change Conference (COP24) went viral. She commented that the world leaders present were "not mature enough to tell it like it is". In the first half of 2019, she joined various student protests around Europe, and was invited to speak at various forums and parliaments. At the January 2019 World Economic Forum, Thunberg gave a speech in which she declared: "Our house is on fire." She addressed the British, European and French parliaments, where in the latter case several right-wing politicians boycotted her. In a short meeting with Thunberg, Pope Francis thanked her and encouraged her to continue. By March 2019, Thunberg was still staging her regular protests outside the Swedish parliament every Friday, where other students occasionally joined her. According to her father, her activism has not interfered with her schoolwork, but she has had less spare time. She finished lower secondary school with good grades. In July 2019, Time magazine reported Thunberg was taking a "sabbatical year" from school, intending to travel in the Americas while meeting people from the climate movement.

Sabbatical year 
In August 2019, Thunberg sailed across the Atlantic Ocean from Plymouth, England, to New York City, USA, in the  racing yacht Malizia II, equipped with solar panels and underwater turbines. The trip was announced as a carbon-neutral transatlantic crossing serving as a demonstration of Thunberg's declared beliefs of the importance of reducing emissions.

France 24 reported that several crew would fly to New York to sail the yacht back to Europe. The voyage took fifteen days, from 14 to 28 August 2019. Thunberg was invited to give testimony in the US House Select Committee on the Climate Crisis on 18 September. Instead of giving testimony, she gave an eight sentence statement and submitted the IPCC Special Report on Global Warming of 1.5 °C as evidence.

UN Climate Action Summit 

On 23 September 2019, Thunberg attended the UN Climate Action Summit in New York City. That day the United Nations Children's Fund (UNICEF) hosted a press conference where Thunberg joined fifteen other children including Ayakha Melithafa, Alexandria Villaseñor, Catarina Lorenzo, Carl Smith and others.

Together, the group announced they had made an official complaint against five nations that are not on track to meet the emission reduction targets they committed to in their Paris Agreement pledges: Argentina, Brazil, France, Germany, and Turkey. The complaint challenges these countries under the Third Optional Protocol to the Convention on the Rights of the Child. The Protocol is a quasi-judicial mechanism which allows children or their representatives, who believe their rights have been violated, to bring a complaint before the relevant 'treaty body', the Committee on the Rights of the Child. If the complaint is successful, the countries will be asked to respond, but any suggestions are not legally binding.

Autumn global climate strikes 
In Canada, Thunberg participated in climate protests in the cities of Montreal, Edmonton and Vancouver, including leading a climate rally as part of the 27 September 2019 Global Climate Strike in Montreal. The school strikes for climate on 20 and 27 September 2019 were attended by over four million people, according to one of the co-organisers. Hundreds of thousands took part in the protest, described as the largest in the city's history. The mayor of Montreal gave her the Freedom of the City. Prime Minister Justin Trudeau was in attendance, and Thunberg spoke briefly with him. While in the United States, Thunberg participated in climate protests in New York City with Alexandria Villaseñor and Xiye Bastida, in Washington DC with Jerome Foster II, Iowa City, Los Angeles, Charlotte, Denver with Haven Coleman, and the Standing Rock Indian Reservation with Tokata Iron Eyes. In various cities, Thunberg's keynote speech began by acknowledging that she was standing on land that originally belonged to Indigenous peoples, saying: "In acknowledging the enormous injustices inflicted upon these people, we must also mention the many enslaved and indentured servants whose labour the world still profits from today."

Participation at COP25 
Thunberg had intended to remain in the Americas to travel overland to attend the United Nations Climate Change Conference (COP25) originally planned in Santiago, Chile, in December. However, it was announced on short notice that COP25 was to be moved to Madrid, Spain, because of serious public unrest in Chile. Thunberg has refused to fly because of the carbon emissions from air travel, so she posted on social media that she needed a ride across the Atlantic Ocean. Riley Whitelum and his wife, Elayna Carausu, two Australians who had been sailing around the world aboard their  catamaran La Vagabonde, offered to take her. So on 13 November 2019, Thunberg set sail from Hampton, Virginia, for Lisbon, Portugal. Her departing message was the same as it has been since she began her activism: "My message to the Americans is the same as to everyone—that is to unite behind the science and to act on the science."

Thunberg arrived in the Port of Lisbon on 3 December 2019, then travelled on to Madrid to speak at COP25 and to participate with the local Fridays for Future climate strikers. During a press conference before the march, she called for more "concrete action", arguing that the global wave of school strikes over the previous year had "achieved nothing" because greenhouse gas emissions were still rising—by 4% since 2015.

Further activism in Europe and end of sabbatical year

On 30 December 2019, Thunberg was guest editor of the BBC Radio's flagship current affairs programme, the Today Programme. Thunberg's edition of the programme featured interviews on climate change with Sir David Attenborough, Bank of England chief Mark Carney, Massive Attack's Robert Del Naja, and Shell Oil executive Maarten Wetselaar. The BBC subsequently released a podcast containing these interviews and other highlights. On 11 January 2020, Thunberg called on German company Siemens to stop the delivery of railway equipment to the controversial Carmichael coal mine, operated by a subsidiary of Indian company Adani Group in Australia, but on 13 January, Siemens said that it would continue to honour its contract with Adani.

On 21 January 2020, Thunberg returned to the World Economic Forum held in Davos, Switzerland, delivered two speeches, and participated in panel discussions hosted by The New York Times and the World Economic Forum. Thunberg used many of the themes contained in her previous speeches, but focused on one in particular: "Our house is still on fire." Thunberg joked that she cannot complain about not being heard, saying: "I am being heard all the time."

In February 2020, Thunberg travelled to Oxford University to meet Malala Yousafzai, a Nobel Peace Prize-winning Pakistani activist for female education who had been shot in the head by the Taliban as a schoolgirl. Thunberg was later to join a school strike in Bristol. On 4 March 2020, Thunberg attended an extraordinary meeting of the European Parliament's Environment Committee to talk about the European Climate Law. There she declared that she considered the new proposal for a climate law published by the European Commission to be a surrender.

On 24 August 2020, Thunberg ended her "gap year" from school when she returned to the classroom. The COVID-19 pandemic severely restricted travel and meetings in 2020 and 2021.

Activism during the COVID-19 pandemic 
In early 2020, the outbreak of the COVID-19 pandemic caused worldwide implementation of mitigation measures, including social distancing, quarantine, and face coverings. On 13 March 2020, Thunberg stated that "In a crisis we change our behavior and adapt to the new circumstances for the greater good of society." Thunberg and School strike for climate subsequently moved their activism and protests online. On 20 August 2020, the second anniversary of Thunberg's first strike, Thunberg and fellow climate activists Luisa Neubauer, Anuna de Wever van der Heyden and Adélaïde Charlier met with German Chancellor Angela Merkel in Berlin. They subsequently announced plans for another global climate strike on 25 September 2020. Neubauer said that whether the strike in September is virtual in nature or in the streets would be determined by the pandemic situation. At a joint press conference with fellow activists echoing her sentiment, Neubauer said: "The climate crisis doesn't pause."

On 14 December 2020, Thunberg used Twitter to criticize the New Zealand Labour Government's recent climate change emergency declaration as "virtue signalling", tweeting that New Zealand's Labour Government had only committed to reducing less than one percent of New Zealand's carbon emissions by 2025. In response, New Zealand Prime Minister Jacinda Ardern and climate change Minister James Shaw defended New Zealand's climate change declaration as only the start of the country's climate change mitigation goals. On 29 December 2020, during a BBC interview, Thunberg said that climate experts are not being listened to despite the COVID-19 pandemic highlighting the importance of using science to address such issues. She added that the COVID-19 crisis had "shone a light" on how "we cannot make it without science".

Thunberg and other climate activists launched the annual Climate Live concert to highlight climate change. Their first concert was held in April 2021. In May 2021, she addressed the COVID-19 crisis again, when she urged a change in the food production system and the protection of animals and their habitats. Thunberg's comments, which came amidst calls for meat-free alternatives, also addressed health concerns regarding animal welfare and the environment. Thunberg said that the way humans are destroying habitats are the perfect conditions for the spread of diseases and noted zoonotic illnesses such as COVID-19, Zika, Ebola, West Nile fever, SARS, MERS, among others. In July 2021, Thunberg received her COVID vaccine, saying: "I am extremely grateful and privileged to be able to live in a part of the world where I can already get vaccinated. The vaccine distribution around the world is extremely unequal. No one is safe until everyone is safe. But when you get offered a vaccine, don't hesitate. It saves lives."

The inaugural edition of Vogue Scandinavia (August–September 2021) had a cover photograph of Thunberg shot by Swedish photography and conservationist duo Iris and Mattias Alexandrov Klum and an interview with her. The cover shows Thunberg wearing a trench coat while sitting with an Icelandic horse in a woodland outside Stockholm. In the interview, Thunberg criticized the promotional campaigns the fashion industry uses to appear sustainable without "actually doing anything to protect the environment" and called the campaigns "greenwashing". On the same day, she used Twitter to criticize the fashion industry as "a huge contributor" to the climate and ecological "emergency" and "not to mention its impact on the countless workers and communities who are being exploited around the world in order for some to enjoy fast fashion that many treat as disposables." Thunberg's wearing of wool during the photoshoot garnered criticism from other vegans, who said it promoted animal cruelty. According to People for the Ethical Treatment of Animals (PETA), she was unaware that the clothing was made of real animal-derived wool.

On 28 September 2021, Thunberg criticized U.S. president Joe Biden, British prime minister Boris Johnson, Indian prime minister Narendra Modi and other world leaders over their promises to address the climate crisis in a speech at the Youth4Climate Summit in Milan. Thunberg also criticized and doubted organizers of climate conferences, saying, "They invite cherry-picked young people to meetings like this to pretend they are listening to us. But they are not." A month later, Thunberg took part in a protest in London, demanding that the financial system stop funding companies and projects that use fossil fuels, such as coal, oil and natural gas. The protest in London is part of a series taking place at the financial centres around the world, including New York City, San Francisco and Nairobi. She told the BBC journalist Andrew Marr that banks should "stop funding our destruction", ahead of the UN COP26 climate summit. At the 2021 United Nations Climate Change Conference in Glasgow, Thunberg attended a panel on climate change hosted by British actress Emma Watson.

In November 2021, Thunberg, along with other climate activists, filed a petition to the United Nations, calling it to declare a level 3 global climate emergency, with the aim of creating a special team that will coordinate the response to the climate crisis at an international level. In December 2021, Thunberg reiterated her criticism of U.S. president Joe Biden, saying, "If you call him a leader – I mean, it's strange that people think of Joe Biden as a leader for the climate when you see what his administration is doing," alluding to the U.S. expansions on use of fossil fuels during the Biden administration. Thunberg further lamented that activists and teenagers are needed in order to bring awareness about climate change.

2022 onwards
Thunberg has condemned British mining firm Beowulf's project to mine iron on Sámi land. She said, "We believe that the climate, the environment, clean air, water, reindeer herding, indigenous rights and the future of humanity should be prioritised above the short-term profit of a company. The Swedish government needs to stop the colonisation of Sami." In July 2022, Thunberg criticized the European Parliament on Twitter for voting to label fossil gas as "green" energy. She continued by stating that the result will delay a "desperately needed real sustainable transition and deepen our dependency on Russian fuels. The hypocrisy is striking, but unfortunately not surprising." In September 2022, Thunberg criticized the government for spending "all their time distracting, delaying and denying the necessary changes ahead of us. The emissions of CO2 are not reducing – they are still increasing." She continued by stating: "The world is still expanding fossil fuel infrastructure and pouring astronomical amounts of money into destruction. We are still speeding in the wrong direction. There is indeed a long way ahead of us but we are still here and we are not planning on going anywhere." Thunberg along with over 600 young people filed a lawsuit against the Swedish state for climate inaction in the country. The lawsuit was submitted to the Stockholm district court.

The Climate Book is a compilation by Thunberg in which she brings together over one hundred expertsgeophysicists, oceanographers and meteorologists; engineers, economists and mathematicians; historians, philosophers and indigenous leaderswho wrote essays focusing on changes to the Earth's climate. Thunberg also contributed writings to the book and is credited as its author. She donated her copyright and all royalties generated by the book to her foundation and will not personally profit from sales or other commercial uses. While on her 2022 midterm Autumn break from school, Thunberg embarked on a publicity campaign for the book's initial release, which occurred in the UK on 27 October 2022 and in Australia on 1 November 2022; it is published under Penguin's Allen Lane Imprint books. On 14 February 2023, it will be released in the United States and elsewhere. An extract from The Climate Book and reviews are available.

On 14 January 2023, Thunberg spoke during a protest in Lützerath, calling on the German authorities to stop the expansion of a nearby coal mine. She was detained along with other activists by German police while demonstrating at the opencast coal mine of Garzweiler 2, around 9 km from the village on 17 January, after police warned the group that they would be detained unless they moved away from the edge of the mine. The mine's owner RWE had earlier agreed with the government on demolishing Lützerath in exchange for a faster exit from coal and the saving of five villages originally slated for destruction. She was released the same day after an identity check.

Position on climate change 

Thunberg asserts that humanity is facing an existential crisis because of global warming and holds the current generation of adults responsible for creating the problem. She uses graphic analogies (such as "our house is on fire") to highlight her concerns and often speaks bluntly to business and political leaders about their failure to take concerted action.

Thunberg has said that climate change will have a disproportionate effect on young people, whose futures will be profoundly affected. She argues that her generation may not have a future any more because "that future was sold so that a small number of people could make unimaginable amounts of money." She also has said that people in the Global South will suffer most from climate change, even though they have contributed least in terms of carbon dioxide emissions. Thunberg has voiced support for other young activists from developing countries who are already facing the damaging effects of climate change. Speaking in Madrid in December 2019, she said: "We talk about our future, they talk about their present."

Speaking at international forums, she berates world leaders because too little action is being taken to reduce global emissions. She says that lowering emissions is not enough, that emissions need to be reduced to zero if the world is to keep global warming to less than 1.5 °C. Speaking to the British Parliament in April 2019, she said: "The fact that we are speaking of 'lowering' instead of 'stopping' emissions is perhaps the greatest force behind the continuing business as usual." In order to take the necessary action, she added that politicians should not listen to her, they should listen to what the scientists are saying about how to address the crisis. According to political scientists Mattia Zulianello and Diego Ceccobelli, Thunberg's ideas can be defined as technocratic ecocentrism, which is grounded on "the exaltation of the vox scientifica".

More specifically, Thunberg has argued that commitments made at the Paris Agreement are insufficient to limit global warming to 1.5 degrees, and that the greenhouse gas emissions curve needs to start declining steeply no later than 2020—as detailed in the IPCC's 2018 Special Report on Global Warming of 1.5 °C. In February 2019, at a conference of the European Economic and Social Committee, she said that the EU's current intention to cut emissions by 40% by 2030 is "not sufficient to protect the future for children growing up today" and that the EU must reduce their  emissions by 80%, double the 40% goal.

Thunberg reiterated her views on political inaction in a November 2020 interview where she stated that "leaders are happy to set targets for decades ahead, but flinch when immediate action is needed." She criticized the European Green Deal, which aims to make the EU climate neutral by 2050, saying that it "sends a strong signal that real and sufficient action is being taken when in fact it's not. Nature doesn't bargain, and you cannot make deals with physics."

In an interview shortly before the 2021 COP26 conference in Glasgow, Thunberg, asked how optimistic she was that the conference could achieve anything, responded, "Nothing has changed from previous years, really. The leaders will say, 'we'll do this and we'll do this, and we will put our forces together and achieve this', and then they will do nothing. Maybe some symbolic things and creative accounting and things that don't really have a big impact. We can have as many COPs as we want, but nothing real will come out of it." She called Chinese president Xi Jinping "a leader of a dictatorship" and said that "democracy is the only solution to the climate crisis, since the only thing that could get us out of this situation is ... massive public pressure."

On 30 October 2021, she arrived at Glasgow Central station for the COP26. She spoke at some protests during the COP and marched in a Fridays for Future Scotland climate strike on Friday 5 November; she said in an earlier interview that the public needed to "uproot the system". She delivered a speech to protesters in which she described COP26 as a failure, speaking of "blah blah blah" and greenwashing.

Public response and impact 
Thunberg has received both strong support and strong criticism for her work from politicians and the press, reflecting the difficulties encountered by leading environmental and scientific voices to be heard in the corridors in power. Thunberg has met with many politicians and world leaders, but said that she could not think of a single politician who has impressed her. Asked about New Zealand prime minister Jacinda Ardern, who described the climate crisis as a matter of life or death, Thunberg commented, "It's funny that people believe Jacinda Ardern and people like that are climate leaders. That just tells you how little people know about the climate crisis." Thunberg ignores words and sentiments: "Obviously the emissions haven't fallen. It goes without saying that these people are not doing anything." In fact, New Zealand's greenhouse-gas emissions had increased by 2% in 2019.

International reception 
In February 2019, 224 academics signed an open letter of support stating they were inspired by Thunberg's actions and the striking school children in making their voices heard. United Nations Secretary-General António Guterres endorsed the school strikes initiated by Thunberg, admitting: "My generation has failed to respond properly to the dramatic challenge of climate change. This is deeply felt by young people. No wonder they are angry." Speaking at an event in New Zealand in May 2019, Guterres said his generation was "not winning the battle against climate change" and that it was up to the youth to "rescue the planet".

Politicians 

Democratic candidates for the 2020 United States presidential election such as Kamala Harris, Beto O'Rourke, and Bernie Sanders expressed support after her speech at the September 2019 action summit in New York. German Chancellor Angela Merkel indicated that young activists such as Thunberg had driven her government to act faster on climate change.

Thunberg and her campaign have been criticized by politicians as well, ranging from personal attacks to statements that she oversimplifies the complex issues involved. Among them are the Australian prime minister Scott Morrison, German chancellor Angela Merkel, French president Emmanuel Macron, Russian president Vladimir Putin, OPEC (Organization of the Petroleum Exporting Countries) and repeatedly by U.S. president Donald Trump.

In September 2019, Trump shared a video of Thunberg angrily addressing world leaders, along with her quote that "people are dying, entire ecosystems are collapsing. We are in the beginning of a mass extinction." Trump wrote about Thunberg, tweeting: "She seems like a very happy young girl looking forward to a bright and wonderful future. So nice to see!" Thunberg reacted by changing her Twitter bio to match his description, and stating that she could not "understand why grown-ups would choose to mock children and teenagers for just communicating and acting on the science when they could do something good instead." In December 2019, President Trump again mocked Thunberg after she was named Person of the Year for 2019 by Time, tweeting: "So ridiculous. Greta must work on her Anger Management problem, then go to a good old fashioned movie with a friend! Chill Greta, Chill!" Thunberg responded by changing her Twitter biography to: "A teenager working on her anger management problem. Currently chilling and watching a good old fashioned movie with a friend." During the 2020 United States presidential election, Thunberg commented on Trump tweeting "Stop the count!" with the text: "So ridiculous. Donald must work on his Anger Management problem, then go to a good old fashioned movie with a friend! Chill Donald, Chill!"

In October 2019, Putin described Thunberg as a "kind girl and very sincere", while suggesting she was being manipulated to serve others' interests. Putin criticized her as "poorly informed", adding, "No one has explained to Greta that the modern world is complex and different and people in Africa or in many Asian countries want to live at the same wealth level as in Sweden." Similar to her reaction to Trump, Thunberg updated her Twitter bio to reflect Putin's description of her. In December 2019, Thunberg tweeted: "Indigenous people are literally being murdered for trying to protect the forest from illegal deforestation. Over and over again. It is shameful that the world remains silent about this." When asked about this subject two days later, Brazilian president Jair Bolsonaro responded, "Greta said that the Indians were dying because they were trying to protect the Amazon. It is impressive how the press gives voice to such a brat." On the same day, Thunberg changed her Twitter description to pirralha, the Portuguese word for "brat" used by Bolsonaro.

In a May 2019 interview with Suyin Haynes in Time, Thunberg addressed the criticism she has received online, saying, "It's quite hilarious when the only thing people can do is mock you, or talk about your appearance or personality, as it means they have no argument or nothing else to say." Former U.S. vice-president and Trump's eventual successor Joe Biden responded to President Trump's tweet mocking Thunberg after she was named the Times Person of the Year 2019 by tweeting at Trump: "What kind of president bullies a teenager? @realDonaldTrump, you could learn a few things from Greta on what it means to be a leader."

On 30 March 2021, European Commissioner for Climate Action Frans Timmermans said in a tweet after talking to Thunberg that "The Commission remains committed" to making the Common Agricultural Policy "fulfill the objectives" of the European Green Deal.

Press 
In August 2019, Scott Walsman wrote in Scientific American that Thunberg's detractors have "launched personal attacks", "bash [her] autism", and "increasingly rely on ad hominem attacks to blunt her influence". Writing in The Guardian, Aditya Chakrabortty said that columnists including Brendan O'Neill, Toby Young, the blog Guido Fawkes, as well as Helen Dale and Rod Liddle at The Spectator and The Sunday Times, had been making "ugly personal attacks" on Thunberg. British TV presenter Piers Morgan also mocked Thunberg. As part of its climate change denial, Germany's right-wing populist party Alternative for Germany (AfD) has attacked Thunberg "in fairly vicious ways", according to Jakob Guhl, a researcher for the Institute for Strategic Dialogue.

Arron Banks' Twitter post saying that "freak yachting accidents do happen in August" outraged a number of British MPs (Member of Parliament), celebrities, and academics. Tanja Bueltmann, founder of EU Citizens' Champion, said Banks had "invoked the drowning of a child" for his own amusement and said that most of those attacking Thunberg "are white middle-aged men from the right of the political spectrum". Writing in The Guardian, Gaby Hinsliff said Thunberg has become "the new front in the Brexit culture war," arguing that the outrage generated by personal attacks on Thunberg by Brexiteers "gives them the welcome oxygen of publicity."

In September 2019, Nick Gillespie wrote in Reason that "Greta Thunberg's histrionics are likely heartfelt but neither they nor the deplorable responses they conjure are a guide forward to good environmental policy in a world that is getting richer every day." In August 2021, Yasmeen Serhan wrote in The Atlantic that Thunberg had become "the target of a barrage of disinformation and conspiracies" from the far-right and populist right, "including depictions of her as a spoiled child, a leftist pawn, and even a Nazi".

"The Greta effect" 

Thunberg has inspired a number of her school-aged peers in what has been described as "the Greta effect". In response to her outspoken stance, various politicians have also acknowledged the need to focus on climate change. Britain's secretary for the environment, Michael Gove, said, "When I listened to you, I felt great admiration, but also responsibility and guilt. I am of your parents' generation, and I recognize that we haven't done nearly enough to address climate change and the broader environmental crisis that we helped to create." Labour politician Ed Miliband, who was responsible for introducing the Climate Change Act 2008, said, "You have woken us up. Thank you. All the young people who have gone on strike have held up a mirror to our society … you have taught us all a really important lesson. You have stood out from the crowd."

In February 2019, Thunberg shared a stage with the then President of the European Commission, Jean-Claude Juncker, where he outlined: "In the next financial period from 2021 to 2027, every fourth euro spent within the EU budget will go towards action to mitigate climate change." Climate issues also played a significant role in European Parliament election in May 2019, as Green parties recorded their best ever results, boosting their MEP seat numbers from 52 to 72. Many of the gains came from northern European countries where young people have taken to the streets inspired by Thunberg.

In June 2019, a YouGov poll in Britain found that public concern about the environment had soared to record levels in the UK since Thunberg and Extinction Rebellion had "pierced the bubble of denial". In August 2019, publication and sales of children's books about the climate crisis reportedly doubled compared to the previous year. Publishers attribute this to the "Greta effect". Inspired by Thunberg, wealthy philanthropists and investors from the United States have donated about $600,000 to support Extinction Rebellion and school strike groups to establish the Climate Emergency Fund. Trevor Neilson, one of the philanthropists, said the three founders would be contacting friends among the global mega-rich to donate "a hundred times" more in the weeks and months ahead. In December 2019, the New Scientist described the impact made by Thunberg and Extinction Rebellion with the headline: "The year the world woke up to climate change."

According to a 2021 study, "those who are more familiar with Greta Thunberg have higher intentions of taking collective actions to reduce global warming and that stronger collective efficacy beliefs mediate this relationship. This association between familiarity with Greta Thunberg, collective efficacy beliefs, and collective action intentions is present even after accounting for respondents' overall support for climate activism."

Flight shame 

Thunberg has spearheaded the anti-flying movement, promoting rail travel over flying on environmental grounds. The buzzword associated with this movement is flygskam or "flight shame". It is a phenomenon in which people feel social pressure not to fly because of the rising greenhouse gas emissions of the airline industry. It was originally championed by Swedish Olympic athlete Björn Ferry, but has gained significant momentum after Thunberg's refusal to fly on environmental grounds. Thunberg backed the campaign to fly less and made it part of her 2019 "awareness tour" in Europe. Sweden reported a 4% drop in domestic air travel for 2019 and an increase in rail use. The BBC says that the movement could halve the growth of global air travel, but Airbus and Boeing say that they still expect to grow at around 4% until 2035. In June 2019, Swedish Railways (SJ) reported that the number of Swedes taking the train for domestic journeys had risen by 8% from the previous year, reflecting growing public concern (reflected in a survey published by Swedish Railways) about the impact of flying on  emissions.

X-Site sticker
In February 2020, X-Site Energy Services of Alberta, Canada, distributed a sticker with the company's name and an image of a man grabbing the braids of a girl while raping her from behind; the word "Greta" on the image.  Then 17-year-old Greta Thunberg posted about it on Twitter: "They are starting to get more and more desperate. This shows that we're winning." Although the general manager of X-Site initially said that neither X-Site nor any X-Site employee was involved in making the sticker, X-Site Energy later apologized, admitting that they have distributed it and are assuming full responsibility. The letter asserted that they were destroying known extant copies and making organizational changes to prevent future incidents.

In popular culture and art 

Thunberg has been depicted in popular culture and art. Greta and the Giants, a book by Zoë Tucker and Zoe Persico, published by Frances Lincoln Children's Books, was inspired by the life of Thunberg. Argentinian artist Andrés Iglesias unveiled an 18 meter mural of Thunberg above Mason street, near Union Square in San Francisco. American painter Elizabeth Peyton chose her 2019 portrait Greta Thunberg as the leading image of one of her shows. She has been depicted in multiple murals. In Bristol, a  mural of Thunberg by artist Jody Thomas, portrays the bottom half of her face as if under rising sea water since May 2019. Thunberg was featured on the Time magazine cover in May 2019 issue, where she was described as a role model and one of the "Next Generation Leaders". She and fifteen others were featured on the cover of the fashion magazine Vogue created by guest editor Meghan, Duchess of Sussex, in September 2019.

Some of Thunberg's speeches have been incorporated into music. In 2019, Thunberg contributed a voiceover for a release of "The 1975", a song by the English band by the same name. Thunberg finishes the song by urging: "So, everyone out there, it is now time for civil disobedience. It is time to rebel." Proceeds will go to Extinction Rebellion at Thunberg's request. In September 2019, John Meredith set her UN Action Summit speech to death metal. The Australian musician Megan Washington and composer Robert Davidson used the same 'how dare you' speech, for a performance at an event exploring the future of music. DJ Fatboy Slim created a mashup of this speech with his dance hit "Right Here, Right Now".

In 2019, Thunberg collaborated with the climate charity Project Pressure on an art piece projected onto the UN building in New York in the lead up to the UN Climate Action Summit featuring the voices of six young activists, including Thunberg herself. Vizualised by Joseph Michael, authored by Klaus Thymann and music by Brian Eno, their commentary was on the climate crisis and the urgent actions that need to be taken to minimize its consequences.

In May 2020, Thunberg was featured in Pearl Jam's music video 'Retrograde'. She appears as a fortune teller, with images in her crystal ball depicting startling effects of climate change in numerous countries.

On 3 September 2020, the Hulu cinéma vérité-esque documentary I Am Greta had its world premiere at the Venice Film Festival. The film was directed by Nathan Grossman, who single-handedly operated the camera and sound equipment while memorializing Thunberg's climate activism "from the first solitary days of her school strike in August 2018, all the way through to her two-week sea voyage across the Atlantic Ocean from Europe to New York City to attend the United Nations Climate Summit in September 2019." Following its Venice premiere, the film had its North American premiere at the Toronto International Film Festival on 11 September 2020, and opened in cinemas across Europe, North America and Australia in October. 

In March 2021, the University of Winchester installed a life-sized sculpture of Thunberg on its campus. BBC Studios made a three-part series Greta Thunberg: A Year to Change the World, with planned visits to various countries omitted due to the COVID-19 pandemic.

Honours and awards
Thunberg has received honours and awards over the course of her activism. In May 2018, before the start of her school strike, she was one of the winners of a climate change essay competition by Svenska Dagbladet (The Swedish Daily News) for young people. Thunberg has refused to attend ceremonies or accept prizes if it requires her to fly, such as for the International Children's Peace Prize. She has received prizes from various NGOs but also from scientific institutions that lauded her success in raising awareness.
 Time 25 most influential teens of 2018, December 2018, an annual list compiled by Time magazine of the most influential teenagers in the world that year.
 Fryshuset scholarship, 2018, for Young Role Model of the Year.
 Nobel Peace Prize nomination, 2019, by three deputies of the Norwegian parliament. Again in 2020 by two Swedish lawmakers. Nominated in 2021 and 2022.
 Swedish Woman of the Year (Årets Svenska Kvinna), March 2019, awarded by the Swedish Women's Educational Association to "a Swedish woman who, through her accomplishments, has represented and brought attention to the Sweden of today in the greater world."
 Rachel Carson Prize, March 2019, awarded to a woman who has distinguished herself in outstanding work for the environment in Norway or internationally.
 Goldene Kamera film and television awards, March 2019, special Climate Action Award. Thunberg dedicated the prize to the activists protesting against the destruction of the Hambach Forest, which is threatened by lignite mining.
 Fritt Ord Award, April 2019, shared with Natur og Ungdom, which "celebrates freedom of speech". Thunberg donated her share of the prize money to a lawsuit seeking to halt Norwegian oil exploration in the Arctic.
 Time 100, April 2019, by Time magazine, an annual list of the 100 most influential people in the world for that year.
 Laudato si' Prize, April 2019, awarded by the Milarepa Foundation of Chile and selected by the International Laudato Si' Group members under the second encyclical of Pope Francis, "on care for our common home".
 Honorary degree of Doctor honoris causa (dr.h.c.), May 2019, conferred by the Belgian, University of Mons (Mons, Belgium) for "contribution ... to raising awareness on sustainable development".
 Ambassador of Conscience Award, June 2019, Amnesty International's most prestigious award, for her leadership in the climate movement, shared with Fridays for Future.
 The Geddes Environment Medal, July 2019, by the Royal Scottish Geographical Society, for "an outstanding practical, research or communications contribution to conservation and protection of the natural environment and the development of sustainability."
 Honorary Fellowship of the Royal Scottish Geographical Society, July 2019, automatically conferred with the Geddes award.
 Right Livelihood Award, September 2019, from the Right Livelihood Foundation and known as Sweden's alternative Nobel Prize, one of four 2019 winners, "for inspiring and amplifying political demands for urgent climate action reflecting scientific facts."
 Keys to the City of Montréal, September 2019, by Mayor of Montréal Valérie Plante.
 International Children's Peace Prize, October 2019, shared with 14-year-old Divina Maloum from Cameroon, awarded by the KidsRights Foundation.
 Maphiyata echiyatan hin win (Woman Who Came from the Heavens), Lakota tribal name conferred, October 2019, at Standing Rock Indian Reservation, following support for the Dakota Access pipeline opposition, after being invited by Tokata Iron Eyes, a 16-year-old Lakota climate activist.
 Nordic Council Environment Prize, October 2019. Thunberg declined to accept the award or the prize money of DKK 350,000 (€47,000 as of October 2019) stating that Nordic countries were not doing enough to cut emissions.
 Time Person of the Year, December 2019, by Time magazine, the first recipient born in the 21st century and the youngest ever. For succeeding in "creating a global attitudinal shift, transforming millions of vague, middle-of-the-night anxieties into a worldwide movement calling for urgent change." And: "For sounding the alarm about humanity's predatory relationship with the only home we have, for bringing to a fragmented world a voice that transcends backgrounds and borders, for showing us all what it might look like when a new generation leads."
 Glamour Woman of the Year Award 2019, 12 November 2019, by Glamour magazine. Accepted by Jane Fonda, quoting Greta as saying "If a Swedish, teenage, science nerd who has shopstop, refuses to fly and has never worn makeup or been to a hairdresser can be chosen a Woman of the Year by one of the biggest fashion magazines in the world then I think almost nothing is impossible."
 She was recognized as one of the BBC's 100 women of 2019.
 Nature's 10, 2019, December 2019, an annual list of ten "people who mattered" in science, produced by the scientific journal Nature, specifically, for being a "climate catalyst: A Swedish teenager [who] brought climate science to the fore as she channeled her generation's rage."
 Forbes list of The World's 100 Most Powerful Women, 2019
 Forbes 30 under 30 Europe 2020 - Social Entrepreneurs
 Human Act Award, on Earth Day, 22 April 2020, by the Human Act Foundation, for "her fearless and determined efforts to mobilize millions of people around the world to fight climate change." The USD100,000 prize money was donated to UNICEF and doubled by the Foundation.
 Best in Activism (from Tech & Innovation category) at the 12th Shorty Awards, on 3 May 2020.
 Gulbenkian Prize for Humanity, in July 2020, the first recipient of this prize. Through her foundation, Thunberg donated the €1 million prize money "to charitable projects combatting the climate and ecological crisis and to support people facing the worst impacts, particularly in the Global South."
 Women in Youth Activism Award at the 2021 Women of Europe Awards on 2 December 2021, for "courageous leadership in support for climate justice, social change and youth community organising".
 Honorary Doctor of Laws (LLD), 31 May 2021, conferred by the University of British Columbia, Okanagan Campus, for "her international recognitions for challenging world leaders to take immediate action against climate change."

Species named in Thunberg's honour 
The following species have been described and named after Greta Thunberg:
 Nelloptodes gretae, by Michael Darby, Natural History Museum, UK, December 2019, a new species of beetle from Kenya in the family Ptiliidae. Its long antennae bear a passing resemblance to her braided pigtails.
 Craspedotropis gretathunbergae, by Schilthuizen et al., 2020, a new species of land snail from Borneo in the family Cyclophoridae.
 Thunberga greta, in a new genus Thunberga gen nov, both by Peter Jäger, June 2020, a new species of huntsman spider in the family Sparassidae. By 2021 the new Thunberga genus contained twenty-five newly described spiders, all from Madagascar and Mayotte, many in honour of other inspirational young people.
 Opacuincola gretathunbergae, by Verhaege & Haase, 2021, a new freshwater snail from New Zealand in the family Tateidae.

Works 
 Scenes from the Heart (2018), with her sister, father and mother.
 96 pages. A collection of Thunberg's climate action speeches, with the earnings being donated to charity.
  An archived compilation of Thunberg's speeches and interviews, and IPCC Reports, up to March 2020
 
 288 pages
Thunberg, Greta; Calderón, Adriana; Jhumu, Farzana Faruk; Njuguna, Eric (2021-08-19). "Opinion | This Is the World Being Left to Us by Adults". The New York Times. ISSN 0362-4331. Retrieved 2022-05-16.
  Hardback.

See also 
 Juliana v. United States, a lawsuit by 21 youths against the United States for significantly harming their right to life and liberty. It seeks to force the government to adopt methods for reducing greenhouse gas emissions.
 Licypriya Kangujam – Indian child environmental activist
 List of most-liked tweets, which lists two tweets by Thunberg
 Severn Cullis-Suzuki – as a minor was also a notable environmental activist in 1992

References

Further reading 
 
 
 
 Mini-documentary portraying Thunberg by Great Big Story (YouTube)
 Make The World Greta Again A Vice documentary that follows Thunberg and the organisers of the school strikes for climate as they are cementing a worldwide movement ahead of their first global protest that took place on 15 March 2019.
 Time's Person of the Year article on Thunberg

External links 

 
 

 
2003 births
Living people
21st-century Swedish people
21st-century Swedish women
Articles containing video clips
Autism activists
BBC 100 Women
Climate activists
Fellows of the Royal Scottish Geographical Society
Peace award winners
People from Stockholm
People with Asperger syndrome
People with obsessive–compulsive disorder
Swedish child activists
Swedish environmentalists
Swedish women environmentalists
Time Person of the Year
Veganism activists
Youth climate activists